Discopyge is a small genus of fish, the apron rays,  in the family Narcinidae.

Species
 Discopyge castelloi Menni, Rincón & M. L. Garcia, 2008
 Discopyge tschudii Heckel, 1846 (Apron ray)

References

Narcinidae
Ray genera
Taxa named by Johann Jakob Heckel